These are the official results of the 2010 Asian Indoor Athletics Championships which took place on 24–26 February 2010 in Tehran, Iran.

Men's results

60 meters

Heats – 24 February

Final – 24 February

400 meters

Heats – 25 February

Final – 26 February

800 meters

Heats – 24 February

Final – 25 February

1500 meters
26 February

3000 meters
24 February

60 meters hurdles

Heats – 26 February

Final – 26 February

4 x 400 meters relay
26 February

High jump
25 February

Pole vault
26 February

Long jump
24 February

Triple jump
26 February

Shot put
25 February

Heptathlon

Women's results

60 meters

Heats – 24 February

Final – 24 February

400 meters

Heats – 25 February

Final – 26 February

800 meters
25 February

1500 meters
26 February

3000 meters
24 February

60 meters hurdles
25 February

4 x 400 meters relay
26 February

High jump
24 February

Pole vault
25 February

Long jump
25 February

Triple jump
26 February

Shot put
24 February

Pentathlon

References
Results (archived)

Asian Indoor
Events at the Asian Indoor Athletics Championships